Nippoptilia philippensis is a moth of the family Pterophoridae. It is known from Mindanao and Mindoro.

Adults are on wing in January, from May to June and in August.

Etymology
The name of the species reflects the country of its origin.

References

Platyptiliini
Moths described in 2003
Insects of the Philippines
Endemic fauna of the Philippines
Fauna of Mindanao
Fauna of Mindoro